Fakhr Makan (also Romanized as Fakhr Makān) is a village in Rostam-e Seh Rural District, Sorna District, Rostam County, Fars Province, Iran. At the 2006 census, its population was 154, in 28 families.

References 

Populated places in Rostam County